Tetraedron is a genus of green algae in the family Hydrodictyaceae.

Species list
 T. acutum
 T. arthrodesmiforme
 T. bifurcatum
 T. caudatum
 T. conicum
 T. constrictum
 T. cruciatum
 T. cruciforme
 T. curvatum
 T. gigas
 T. gracile
 T. granulosum
 T. hastatum
 T. hortense
 T. incus
 T. limneticum
 T. lobulatum
 T. longispinum
 T. minimum
 T. minutissimum
 T. minutum
 T. muticum
 T. obtusum
 T. octaedricum
 T. pachydermum
 T. planctonicum
 T. proteiforme
 T. pusillum
 T. rectangulare
 T. regulare
 T. reticulatum
 T. simmeri
 T. staurastroides
 T. striatum
 T. triangulare
 T. trigonum
 T. trilobatum
 T. tumidulum
 T. vulgare
 T. wasteneysii

References

Sphaeropleales genera
Sphaeropleales